Mary Shelley (working title A Storm in the Stars) is a 2017 romantic period-drama film directed by Haifaa al-Mansour and written by Emma Jensen. The plot follows Mary Shelley's first love and her romantic relationship with the poet Percy Bysshe Shelley, which inspired her to write her 1818 novel Frankenstein; or, The Modern Prometheus. An international co-production, the film stars Elle Fanning as Shelley, with Maisie Williams, Douglas Booth, Bel Powley, and Ben Hardy in supporting roles.

The film had its world premiere at the Toronto International Film Festival on September 9, 2017. It was released in the United States on May 25, 2018, by IFC Films, and in the United Kingdom on July 6 by Curzon Artificial Eye.

Plot
Mary Godwin was the daughter of the pioneering feminist writer Mary Wollstonecraft and her husband, the publisher and political philosopher William Godwin. Mary Wollstonecraft had died shortly after giving birth, and when the film opens 16 years later Mary Godwin is living with her father, her stepmother (with whom she has a strained relationship), and her stepsister and close confidante Claire Clairmont.

On an extended visit to Scotland, Mary meets and falls in love with the radical and unconventional poet Percy Bysshe Shelley, who is already married. The couple elope, taking Claire with them. Shelley has little money of his own, but borrows against his wealthy father's estate to set themselves up in lavish style in Bloomsbury. At a dinner party, Shelley flirts with Claire, and Mary meets 
one of Shelley's friends who later 
makes advances towards her
. When she complains, Shelley tells her that in his view lovers should be free. He wants her to take other partners, and demands the same freedom for himself. He calls her a hypocrite, and she expresses her disappointment in him. Later, Mary, Claire and Shelley attend a public display of galvanism in which a dead frog is made to twitch by the application of electricity. Also in the audience is the handsome and famous poet Lord Byron. Claire introduces herself, and is smitten.

One night, Shelley's creditors arrive unexpectedly, and Mary, Claire and Shelley have to flee in pouring rain. They take up cheap lodgings. Mary gives birth, but her baby does not survive for long. Claire announces that she is pregnant by Byron, and that he has invited them all to stay with him at a villa near Geneva. When they arrive, Byron makes it clear that the "invitation" is little more than Claire's wishful thinking. Nevertheless, he asks them to stay.

The poor weather keeps them indoors for days, and one evening out of boredom Byron challenges the group to write a ghost story, a task which captures Mary's imagination and causes her to dream of galvanism. A message arrives for Shelley informing him that his wife has just drowned herself. Throughout the visit, Byron treats Claire with increasing contempt. She loses patience and confronts him, but he laughingly responds that his affair with her was a mere dalliance, "a lapse in judgement". He says that he will provide financially for her baby, but nothing more.

The three return to their lodgings in England, and Mary starts to write a novel, Frankenstein. The stresses drive Mary and Shelley apart. No publisher will take the work under Mary's name as it is considered unsuitable subject-matter for a lady, but with the addition of a foreword by Shelley it is eventually accepted for anonymous publication. The book is a success, with Shelley initially being given the credit until he publicly discloses the name of the true author. The couple reconnect.

Mary's father arranges for a second publication of her novel under her own name, ensuring that she derives an income from it. In the last scene of the film Mary, dressed in black, is seen walking with a young son. An afterword explains that Mary and Shelley had married, and that they stayed together until Shelley's death at the age of 29. Mary never married again.

Cast 
 Elle Fanning as Mary Shelley
 Douglas Booth as Percy Bysshe Shelley
 Tom Sturridge as Lord Byron
 Bel Powley as Claire Clairmont
 Stephen Dillane as William Godwin
 Ben Hardy as John William Polidori
 Maisie Williams as Isabel Baxter
 Joanne Froggatt as Mary Jane Clairmont
 Derek Riddell as William Baxter
 Hugh O'Conor as Samuel Taylor Coleridge

Production 
Mary Shelley (changed from the original title, A Storm in the Stars, in January 2017) is based on an original screenplay by Australian screenwriter Emma Jensen. Jensen received development funding from Screen NSW and Screen Australia to develop the screenplay to first draft and her US agents, United Talent Agency, sold the screenplay to US producer Amy Baer. Director Haifaa al-Mansour was set to direct the film.

The casting process went from 2014 to 2016. Elle Fanning was cast in the film to play Mary Shelley. The Diary of a Teenage Girl star Bel Powley joined the film to play Claire Clairmont, Mary's stepsister, who complicates the relationship between both lovers. Douglas Booth was cast in the film to play the role of Percy, while HanWay Films was on board to produce the film and handle the film's international sales. Ben Hardy joined the film, which would be also produced by Alan Moloney and Ruth Coady of Parallel Films. Tom Sturridge, Maisie Williams, Stephen Dillane, and Joanne Froggatt joined the cast.

Principal photography began on February 20, 2016 in Dublin, Ireland. On March 7, the production moved to Luxembourg.

Release
The film had its world premiere at the Toronto International Film Festival on September 9, 2017. Shortly after, IFC Films and Curzon Artificial Eye acquired U.S. and U.K. distribution rights to the film, respectively. The film had its American premiere at the Tribeca Film Festival on April 28, 2018.
It was released in the United States on May 25, and in the United Kingdom on July 6.

Reception

Box office
Mary Shelley grossed $97,321 in the United States and Canada, and $1.8 million in other territories, for a worldwide total of $1.9 million.

Critical response
On review aggregator Rotten Tomatoes, the film has an approval rating of 41% based on 130 reviews, with an average rating of 5.6/10. The website's critical consensus reads, "Mary Shelley smooths out its subject's fascinating life and fails to communicate the spark of her classic work, undermining fine period detail and a solid Elle Fanning performance". On Metacritic, the film has a weighted average score of 49 out of 100, based on 28 critics, indicating "mixed or average reviews".

References

External links
 
 
 
 
 
 

2017 films
American romantic drama films
Irish romantic drama films
HanWay Films films
IFC Films films
2017 romantic drama films
Romance films based on actual events
Films shot in Ireland
Films directed by Haifaa al-Mansour
Cultural depictions of Lord Byron
Cultural depictions of John Polidori
Cultural depictions of Mary Shelley
Cultural depictions of Percy Bysshe Shelley
Love stories
Biographical films about writers
2010s English-language films
2010s American films